Louis Antoine of France, Duke of Angoulême (6 August 1775 – 3 June 1844) was the elder son of Charles X of France and the last Dauphin of France from 1824 to 1830. He was disputedly King of France and Navarre for less than 20 minutes before he himself abdicated, due to his father's abdication during the July Revolution in 1830. He never reigned over the country, but after his father's death in 1836, he was the legitimist pretender as Louis XIX.

He was a petit-fils de France at birth, and was initially known as Louis Antoine d'Artois. After his father's accession to the throne, he became Dauphin de France, and his surname changed to de France, following the royal custom for princes with such rank.

Biography

Early life
Louis was born at Versailles, as the eldest son of Charles Philippe, Count of Artois, the youngest brother of King Louis XVI of France. He was born one year after the death of his great-grandfather, Louis XV of France. His mother was Princess Maria Theresa of Savoy (known as Marie Thérèse in France), the daughter of Victor Amadeus III of Sardinia and Maria Antonia of Spain.

From 1780 until 1789, Louis Antoine and his younger brother, Charles Ferdinand, Duke of Berry, were educated by Armand-Louis de Sérent marquis de Sérent, their gouverneur, in the château de Beauregard, 5 km from Versailles. On the outbreak of the French Revolution in 1789 the two young princes followed their father into exile to first Turin, then to Germany and finally England.

In 1792, Louis Antoine joined the émigré army of his cousin, the Prince of Condé.

In June 1795, his uncle, the comte de Provence, proclaimed himself King Louis XVIII. Later that year, the 20-year-old Louis Antoine led an unsuccessful royalist uprising in the Vendée. In early 1797, he joined his brother and uncle in the German Duchy of Brunswick, hoping to join the Austrian Army. The defeat of Austria by France obliged them to flee, and they took refuge in Mittau, Courland, under the protection of Tsar Paul I of Russia.

There, on 10 June 1799, he married his first cousin, Marie Thérèse of France, the eldest child of Louis XVI and Marie Antoinette, and the only member of the immediate royal family to survive the French Revolution. Since her release from the Temple Prison in 1795, she had been living at the Austrian court. They had no children.

Military service
In April 1800, Louis Antoine took command of a regiment of cavalry in the Bavarian army and took part in the battle of Hohenlinden against the French, showing some ability.

In early 1801, Tsar Paul made peace with Bonaparte, and the French court in exile fled to Warsaw, then controlled by Prussia. For the next ten years, Louis-Antoine accompanied and advised his uncle, Louis XVIII. They returned to Russia when Alexander I became Tsar, but in mid-1807 the treaty between Napoleon and Alexander forced them to take refuge in Britain. There, at Hartwell House, King Louis reconstituted his court, and Louis-Antoine was granted an allowance of £300 a month. Twice (in 1807 and 1813) he attempted to return to Russia to join the fight against Napoleon, but was refused permission by the Tsar. He remained in Britain until 1814 when he sailed to Bordeaux, which had declared for the King. His entry into the city on 12 March 1814 was regarded as the beginning of the Bourbon restoration. From there, Louis Antoine fought alongside the Duke of Wellington to bring about Napoleon’s overthrow.

Flight to Britain and return

Louis Antoine was unable to prevent Napoleon's return to Paris as chief of the royalist army in the southern Rhône River valley, and he was again forced to flee to Britain during the "Hundred Days". He loyally served Louis XVIII after the final defeat of Napoleon at Waterloo. In 1823, he commanded a French army sent into Spain to restore the King's absolute powers, known as the Hundred Thousand Sons of Saint Louis. He was victorious in the Battle of Trocadero, after which the reactionary power of King Ferdinand VII of Spain was firmly restored. For this achievement, he was awarded the title of a Prince of Trocadero.

Upon the King's death in 1824, his father became King Charles X and Louis-Antoine became Dauphin, heir-apparent to the throne. He supported his father's reactionary policy of purging France of her recent revolutionary and imperial past, expelling former imperial officers from the Army.

July Revolution
Masses of angry demonstrators demanded the abdication of Charles and of his descendants in July 1830, in what became known as the July Revolution, in favour of his cousin Louis Philippe, Duke of Orléans. They sent a delegation to the Tuileries Palace to force his compliance.

Charles reluctantly signed the document of abdication on 2 August 1830. It is said that Louis Antoine spent the next 20 minutes listening to the entreaties of his wife not to sign a similar document, while the former Charles X sat weeping. However, he also abdicated, in favour of his nephew the duke of Bordeaux. For the final time he left for exile, where he was known as the "Count of Marnes". He never returned to France.

Louis Antoine and his wife travelled to Edinburgh, Scotland, in November 1830 and took up residence in a house at 21 (now 22) Regent Terrace near Holyrood Palace where Charles X was staying.

Emperor Francis I of Austria offered the Prague Castle in Prague to the royal entourage in 1832, so Louis-Antoine and Charles X moved there. Francis I, however, died in 1835, and his successor Ferdinand I of Austria told the French royal family that he needed the palace for his coronation in the summer of 1836. The exiled French kings and their entourage therefore left and eventually arrived at the palace of Grafenberg in Görz, Austria (now Gorizia, Italy) on 21 October 1836.

Many legitimists did not recognize the abdications as valid, and recognized Charles X as king until his death in 1836, with Louis XIX succeeding him. Louis Antoine died in Görz in 1844, aged 68. He was buried in his father Charles X's crypt in the church of the Franciscan monastery of Kostanjevica in Nova Gorica, Slovenia. Upon his death, his nephew the Duke of Bordeaux became head of the royal family of France under the regnal name Henry V, although he used the title of Count of Chambord in exile.

In fiction and film
The newborn Duke of Angoulême is portrayed by an uncredited child actor in a brief scene in the movie Marie Antoinette. This scene contains an error as it mistakenly names his parents as Louis XVIII and Marie Josephine Louise of Savoy, who never had children.

See also

 List of shortest-reigning monarchs
 Duc d'Angoulême's porcelain factory

Footnotes

External link

|-

|-

|-

 

1775 births
1844 deaths
19th-century monarchs of France
People from Versailles
Legitimist pretenders to the French throne
Dukes of Angoulême
Princes of France (Bourbon)
Burials at Kostanjevica Monastery
Dauphins of France
French generals
French counter-revolutionaries
Grand Crosses of the Order of Saint Louis
Grand Croix of the Légion d'honneur
Grand Crosses of the Military Order of Maria Theresa
Knights Grand Cross of the Military Order of William
Recipients of the Order of St. George of the First Degree
Knights of the Golden Fleece of Spain
Navarrese titular monarchs
Heirs apparent who never acceded
Sons of kings